Lorne Creek is a creek located in the Omineca Country region of British Columbia. This creek flows into the Skeena River from the west and is located between Terrace and Hazleton, approximately 3 miles north of Doreen. Henry McDame discovered gold in this creek back in 1884. The creek has been mined for gold.

See also
List of rivers of British Columbia

References

External links
 

Rivers of British Columbia